Xavier Kelly (born October 2, 1997) is an American football defensive tackle who is a free agent. He played college football at Arkansas.

Professional career

Baltimore Ravens
Kelly went undrafted in the 2021 NFL Draft. On May 1, 2021, he signed with the Baltimore Ravens as an undrafted free agent. On May 27, Kelly suffered a torn achilles while at practice, which prematurely ended his rookie season. He was waived with injuries on June 1, 2021, but was reverted to injured reserve the following day. He was waived on May 11, 2022.

References

External links
 
 Baltimore Ravens profile
 Arkansas Razorbacks profile

Living people
1997 births
People from Wichita, Kansas
Players of American football from Kansas
American football defensive tackles
Arkansas Razorbacks football players
Baltimore Ravens players